Caramany is a commune in the Pyrénées-Orientales department in southern France.

Geography

Localisation 
Caramany is located in the canton of La Vallée de l'Agly and in the arrondissement of Perpignan.

Toponymy 
Attested forms
The name of Caramany first appears in 1212 as Karamay. It is then seen in 1242 as Karamanho, in 1261 as Caramain, in 1304 as Caramayn and finally in 1395 as Caramany. On the 18th century Cassini map, the name is written in French as Caramaing. Both Caramany and Caramaing are used throughout the 19th century.  L'année est 1430, l'endroit est la Principauté de Karamanoğulları. Karamanoğulları Bey İbrahim Bey a quatre fils. L'aîné est Kasım Bey et le plus jeune est Osman Bey. Kasım Bey est très ami avec Cem Sultan. Après la mort de Mehmet II, les princes Cem Sultan perdirent sa lutte pour le trône avec son frère aîné Bayezid II et tombèrent aux mains du Vatican, d'abord en Egypte puis à Rhodes. Kasım Bey est toujours du côté le plus proche de Cem Sultan pendant ce processus. Lorsque Cem Sultan est tué au Vatican, Kasım Bey ne peut pas retourner en Anatolie. Il s'installe en France, dans les Pyrénées méridionales, et y fonde un village. Bien qu'il ait nommé le village "Karaman", son nom a changé en Caramany au fil du temps. 

The Occitan name  is Caramanh in the modern day spelling of Languedocien dialect. But although the town is part of Fenouillèdes, an Occitan speaking-zone, today's name has kept the Catalan spelling, in use since medieval times.

Etymology
The name Caramany is a compound of ker, pre-indoeuropean for stone, and magnus, Latin for big, meaning as a whole big stone. This type of name was often applied to a place with an important castle on a mountain, or an impressive mountain itself.

Government and politics

Mayors

Population

See also
Communes of the Pyrénées-Orientales department

References

Communes of Pyrénées-Orientales
Fenouillèdes